Udhna (Also Called Udhana) is a Suburban area of Surat, located primarily on Surat-Navsari Highway in the Indian state of Gujarat. Udhna is an Industrial Area in city of Surat, India. It is about 9 km from Surat central Railway Station and 14 km from Surat Airport.

Demographics
 census, Udhna had a population of 407,970. Males constitute 63% of the population and females 37%. Udhna has an average literacy rate of 74%, higher than the national average of 59.5%. Male literacy is 81%, and female literacy is 63%. In Udhna, 14% of the population is under 6 years of age.

See also 
List of tourist attractions in Surat

References 

Suburban area of Surat
Neighbourhoods in Surat
Economy of Surat
1967 establishments in Gujarat